Abdulrahman Al-Johani (born 21 September 1988) is a Saudi Arabian handball player for Al-Ahli and the Saudi Arabian national team.

References

1988 births
Living people
Saudi Arabian male handball players
Place of birth missing (living people)
21st-century Saudi Arabian people